{{Infobox football club |
  clubname = Lurgan Celtic |
  image    =|
  fullname = Lurgan Celtic Football Club |
  nickname = Lurgan Hoops, 
Wee Hoops, 
Lurgan Bhoys |
  founded  = 1903 |
  ground   = Lord Lurgan Park / Allenhill Park |
  capacity = | 500
  chairman = |   
  manager =  Michael Smyth |
  league   = Mid-Ulster Football League Junior Division 2 |
  season   = 2021/22|
  position = Mid-Ulster Football League Division 3 
2nd|
pattern_la1=_white_hoops|pattern_b1=_whitehoops|pattern_ra1=_white_hoops|pattern_so1=_hoops_green_2|
leftarm1=006600|body1=006600|rightarm1=006600|shorts1=FFFFFF|socks1=FFFFFF|
pattern_la2=|pattern_b2=|pattern_ra2=|
leftarm2=FFBE06|body2=FFBE06|rightarm2=FFBE06|shorts2=145000|socks2=FFBE06|
}}Lurgan Celtic Football Club is a Northern Irish intermediate football club based in Lurgan, County Armagh, that currently plays in the Mid-Ulster Football League Junior Division 3. The club was founded, 1903 & re-formed in 1970 who plays in a strip based on Scottish team Celtic. On 15 August 2019, Lurgan Celtic announced that its senior side would withdraw from the NIFL and implement new youth academy structures, with a view to restarting its senior teams for the 2020-21 season. Lurgan Celtic resumed senior football activities at the bottom of the Mid-Ulster Football League pyramid, upon the commencement of the 2020-21 season.

History
A club by the name of Lurgan Celtic was originally formed in 1903, with the obvious slant of aiming towards the Roman Catholic community of the town, adopting the name and colours of Glasgow Celtic, a popular club among the Irish Catholics population of Glasgow and the west of Scotland. At the time it was a bold move to try and break into the world of football. The Gaelic Athletic Association was in its early stages and was keen to promote Gaelic sports and football in particular, perceived as "foreign", was discouraged. A change in attitudes gradually took hold in the early 1970s and Lurgan Celtic was reborn to try its luck again in the local football scene, quickly rising to become one of the strongest clubs in the Craigavon area.

Irish Football League membership remained elusive during these years, partly due to the presence of Glenavon down the road at a time when the IFA was trying to reach out to new footballing towns. There was also a suggestion that it was the club's clearly Nationalist stance as they pushed for membership of what was considered a predominantly Unionist league that stood in their way. So strongly was this felt that the club joined forces with Belfast club Donegal Celtic, another club that took its name and kit from the Glasgow club, and threatened the League with legal action to gain membership. The restructuring of the league in the early part of the 21st century eventually resulted in both Celtic clubs gaining admission to the Irish Football League Second Division for the 2002–03 season.

In 2003 the club closed their town centre ground Grattan Park and relocated to share Oxford United's ground on the edge of Lurgan at Knockramer Park, which offered better facilities.

Promotion to the Intermediate League First Division was achieved in 2006–07, but in 2008 the club failed to meet the criteria for a place in the new IFA Championship, and found itself in the IFA Interim League for the 2008–09 season. They successfully made the necessary improvements to gain admission to the newly formed third tier, IFA Championship 2, for the 2009–10 season. After seven seasons of consolidation in Championship 2 with occasional flirts with relegation, Celtic surged to the 2014–15 NIFL Championship 2 title, achieving promotion to the national second tier, Championship 1.

On the back of their title success the previous season, Celtic pulled off one of the local game's biggest giant-killing acts of the 21st century. After reaching the quarter-finals for the first time ever in the 2015–16 Irish Cup, Celtic were drawn to face senior NIFL Premiership side and beaten Irish Cup finalists the previous year, Portadown away at Shamrock Park. Celtic stunned the Ports by taking a 2–0 lead after 54 minutes. However, Portadown came back into the match after 70 minutes with two goals of their own to level the score at 2–2. However, Lurgan Celtic had the last say, and scored a last-minute penalty to win 3–2 and cause a major upset by eliminating Portadown, and reaching the semi-finals of the cup for the first time in the club's history. The match was also notable as Portadown's final match under the management of Ronnie McFall. After the match, the Portadown manager resigned, ending his reign at the club after 29 years. In the Irish Cup semi-final they were defeated 3–0 by Linfield with Aaron Burns scoring a hat-trick.

Despite the achievement of reaching the Irish-Cup semi-finals, manager Colin Malone resigned at the end of the 2016-17 season and the club endured a period of instability. The appointment of Brendan Shannon as Celtic player-manager could not prevent a serious downturn in results, and Shannon left halfway through the 2017-18 season, to be succeeded by Frankie Wilson. By this point, relegation to the third tier had become an inevitability; Celtic finished the season 20 points adrift of 11th-placed Dergview. 

Life in the NIFL Premier Intermediate League started with another managerial change, with former Glenavon, Spurs and Northern Ireland winger Gerard McMahon taking the reins at Knockramer Park. This, however, failed to stem the club's decline, as they finished second-bottom of the division, on 19 points. 

A 17-year spell in the Northern Ireland Football League ended on 15 August 2019, as the club announced its intention to withdraw from the Premier Intermediate League, with a view to reforming youth structures and resuming senior football activities for the 2020-21 season. It was announced on 29 June 2020 that Lurgan Celtic's application to join the Mid-Ulster Football League was accepted, and the club will play in the MUFL Junior Division 3 for the 2020-21 season.

 Current squad 

Honours
Intermediate honoursNIFL Championship 2 (tier 3): 12014–15Mid-Ulster League Division 1: 11922/23Mid-Ulster Football League: 1 
1997–98Northern Ireland Intermediate League: 12000–01Mid-Ulster Cup: 31911/12, 1912/13, 1914/15Mid-Ulster Shield: 11971/72Bob Radcliffe Cup: 21997–98, 2011–12Gerald Kennedy Cup 22007, 2022

Junior honoursIrish Junior Cup: 11990–91John Magee Cup: 1'''
2022

External links
Lurgan Celtic Homepage
Ground Hopper's tour of Knockramer Park

References

Association football clubs established in 1970
Association football clubs in Northern Ireland
Association football clubs in County Armagh
Lurgan